Alastair Robin McGlashan (1933 – 19 June 2012) was a British Anglican priest, Tamil scholar and a Jungian analyst. 

He published many books, including a critically acclaimed translation of Periyapuranam, a Saivite religious literature in Tamil.

References

20th-century English Anglican priests
Dravidologists
Date of birth missing
1933 births
2012 deaths
Clergy from Plymouth, Devon
Writers from Plymouth, Devon